Frederick Saint-John Hughes (22 February 1866 – 3 November 1956) was a British sailor who competed in the 1908 Summer Olympics. He was a crew member of the British boat Sorais, which won the bronze medal in the 8 metre class.

References

External links
profile

1866 births
1956 deaths
British male sailors (sport)
Sailors at the 1908 Summer Olympics – 8 Metre
Olympic sailors of Great Britain
Olympic bronze medallists for Great Britain
Olympic medalists in sailing
Medalists at the 1908 Summer Olympics
20th-century British people